Events in the year 2018 in Nigeria.

Incumbents

Federal government
 President: Muhammadu Buhari (APC)
 Vice President: Yemi Osinbajo (APC)
 Senate President: Bukola Saraki (PDP)
 House Speaker: Yakubu Dogara (PDP)
 Chief Justice: Walter Samuel Nkanu Onnoghen

Governors
 Abia State: Okezie Ikpeazu (PDP) 
 Adamawa State: Bindo Jibrilla (APC) 
 Akwa Ibom State: Udom Emmanuel (PDP) 
 Anambra State: Willie Obiano (APGA)
 Bauchi State: M. A. Abubakar (APC)
 Bayelsa State: Henry Dickson (PDP)
 Benue State: Samuel Ortom (APC)
 Borno State: Kashim Shettima (APC)
 Cross River State: Ben Ayade (PDP) 
 Delta State: Ifeanyi Okowa (PDP) 
 Ebonyi State: Dave Umahi (PDP)
 Edo State: Godwin Obaseki (PDP) 
 Ekiti State: Ayo Fayose (PDP) (until 16 October); Kayode Fayemi (APC) (starting 16 October)
 Enugu State: Ifeanyi Ugwuanyi (PDP) 
 Gombe State: Ibrahim Dankwambo (PDP)
 Imo State: Rochas Okorocha (APC)
 Jigawa State: Badaru Abubakar (APC)
 Kaduna State: Nasir el-Rufai (APC) 
 Kano State: Umar Ganduje (APC) 
 Katsina State: Aminu Masari (APC) 
 Kebbi State: Abubakar Atiku Bagudu (APC)
 Kogi State: Yahaya Bello (APC)
 Kwara State: Abdulfatah Ahmed (APC)
 Lagos State: Akinwumi Ambode (APC) 
 Nasarawa State: Umaru Al-Makura (APC)
 Niger State: Abubakar Sani Bello (APC) 
 Ogun State: Ibikunle Amosun (APC)
 Ondo State: Oluwarotimi Odunayo Akeredolu (PDP)
 Osun State: Rauf Aregbesola (APC) (until 27 November); Gboyega Oyetola (APC) (starting 27 November)
 Oyo State: Abiola Ajimobi (APC)
 Plateau State: Simon Lalong (APC) 
 Rivers State: Ezenwo Nyesom Wike (PDP)
 Sokoto State: Aminu Tambuwal (APC) 
 Taraba State: Darius Ishaku (PDP) 
 Yobe State: Ibrahim Geida (APC)
 Zamfara State: Abdul-aziz Yari Abubakar (APC)

Events

 19 February – Dapchi schoolgirls kidnapping
 17 September - Over 100 people are killed in floods after two major rivers burst their banks.
 13 October - At least 30 people are killed when a pipeline caught fire and explodes in southeast Nigeria after a raid by suspected petrol thieves.

Scheduled 
Osun State gubernatorial election, 2018

Popular culture

Sports
9 to 25 February – Nigeria participated at the 2018 Winter Olympics in PyeongChang, South Korea, with 3 competitors in 2 sports

Deaths

2 January – Lawal Kaita, politician (b. 1932).
22 January – Dahiru Musdapher, justice (b. 1942)
27 February – Joseph Bagobiri, Roman Catholic Bishop (b. 1957)
23 March – Idowu Sofola, jurist (b. 1934).
25 April – Adebayo Adedeji, economist, academic, politician and diplomat (b 1930).
10 June – Ras Kimono, reggae musician (b. 1958).
18 July – A. I. Katsina-Alu, judge (b. 1941).
19 July – Ibrahim Coomassie, police officer (b. 1942).
18 August – Denis Edozie, Supreme Court judge (b. 1935).
28 December – Shehu Shagari, 6th President of Nigeria

See also
List of Nigerian films of 2018

References

 
2010s in Nigeria
Years of the 21st century in Nigeria
Nigeria
Nigeria